The Saale-Elster Viaduct is a railway bridge along the Erfurt–Leipzig/Halle high-speed railway in Central Germany. It was completed in 2013 and opened in 2015. It includes a branch of  length.

The prestressed concrete box girder bridge carries a Deutsche Bahn Intercity-Express (ICE) line over the extended floodplain at the confluence of the Saale and White Elster rivers, a natural habitat of wild fauna and flora south of Halle, Saxony-Anhalt. The branch provides a connection to the parallel Halle–Bebra railway line.

References

Viaducts in Germany
Buildings and structures in Saxony-Anhalt